Agyneta regina is a species of sheet weaver found in the United States. It was described by Chamberlin & Ivie in 1944.

References

regina
Spiders of the United States
Spiders described in 1944